The 1951 Notre Dame Fighting Irish football team represented the University of Notre Dame during the 1951 college football season.

Schedule

Team players drafted into the NFL
The following players were drafted into professional football following the season.

References

Notre Dame
Notre Dame Fighting Irish football seasons
Notre Dame Fighting Irish football